Serbs in Norway are Norwegian citizens and residents of ethnic Serb descent or Serbian-born persons who reside in Norway.

Demographics
The Norwegian census data includes immigrants with country of birth (first-generation) and Norwegian-born with immigrant parentage (second-generation), but does not include ethnicity, thus, the total number of ethnic Serbs in Norway is hard to define. According to 2006 data, there were 10,042 immigrants from Serbia and Montenegro, 2,863 with parents from that country, 12,718 from Bosnia and Herzegovina, 2,104 with parents from that country, 2,566 from Croatia, 449 with parents from that country. In 2001, the number of immigrants from FR Yugoslavia (Serbia and Montenegro) was 15,469. 2017 data lists 6,396 immigrants from Serbia and Norwegian-born descendants.

The Serbian Ministry of Diaspora estimated in 2007 that there was a Serb diaspora community numbering ca. 2,500 people in Norway. This data includes emigrants from Serbia as well as ethnic Serbs or other minorities who view Serbia as their nation-state.

History

Serbs and Serbians have migrated to Norway as guest and migrant workers during Socialist Yugoslavia, and as refugees of the Yugoslav Wars of the 1990s.

Notable people

See also 
 Norway–Serbia relations
 Serbian Orthodox Eparchy of Britain and Scandinavia
 Serbs in Sweden

References 

Norway
Immigration to Norway
 
Norway
Norway